Dame Jennifer Jane Eady (born 31 May 1965) is a British High Court judge.  

She was educated at Boston High School in Lincolnshire. She was studied politics, philosophy and economics at St Hugh's College, Oxford, completing a BA in 1986, and then completed a graduate diploma in law at the Polytechnic of Central London in 1988.  

Eady was called to the bar at Inner Temple and practised employment law after completing her pupillage at Old Square Chambers in 1990 and remained there until 2013. She served as a recorder from 2003 to 2013, took silk in 2006, and was a senior circuit judge from 2013. She was chair of the Employment Tribunals and a part-time employment judge from 2001 until 2008, member of the Acas Council from 2008 to 2014, and a trustee of the Free Representation Unit from 2006 to 2014.  

On 1 October 2019, Eady was appointed a judge of the High Court and assigned to the Queen's Bench Division. She took the customary damehood in 2019. From 2022, she has been President of the Employment Appeal Tribunal, replacing Sir Akhlaq Choudhury. 

She is married and has one son.

References 

Living people
1965 births
British women judges
Dames Commander of the Order of the British Empire
Alumni of St Hugh's College, Oxford
Members of the Inner Temple
Queen's Bench Division judges
21st-century English judges